Rui Gabriel Pinheiro Vieira (born 13 November 1991 in Braga) is a Portuguese professional footballer who plays for A.R. São Martinho as a goalkeeper.

References

External links

1991 births
Living people
Sportspeople from Braga
Portuguese footballers
Association football goalkeepers
Primeira Liga players
Liga Portugal 2 players
Segunda Divisão players
S.C. Braga players
F.C. Vizela players
S.C. Covilhã players
C.S. Marítimo players
Rio Ave F.C. players
F.C. Arouca players
AD Fafe players
A.R. São Martinho players
Portugal youth international footballers